Mr Loverman is the seventh novel written by British-Nigerian author Bernardine Evaristo. Published by Penguin Books in 2013 and Akashic Books in 2014, Mr Loverman explores the life of Britain's older Caribbean community, through the perspective of a 74-year-old Antiguan-Londoner and closet homosexual.

Reception 
The novel was positively reviewed in The Guardian. In 2014, Mr Loverman won the Jerwood Uncovered Prize.

References 

2013 British novels
Penguin Books books
Novels by Bernardine Evaristo